Saravá is a musical with a book and lyrics by N. Richard Nash and music Mitch Leigh. The musical was based on the book Dona Flor and Her Two Husbands by Brazilian writer Jorge Amado, published in 1966.

Synopsis
Set in Salvador, Bahia, the musical starts with the sudden death of Dona Flor's husband, Vadinho, who collapses in the midst of Carnival celebrations. After a period of mourning, Dona Flor attracts another admirer, a local pharmacist, Teodoro.  While her new husband lacks the passionate sensuality of Vadinho, he compensates by providing a life free of worry.  But, on the first anniversary of her marriage, Vadinho returns.  He is now a ghost, but has lost none of his old ways.

History
The musical started its try-out period at the Colonial Theatre in Boston, Massachusetts. It ran from December 25th 1978 to January 6th 1979, being cut short by a week due to poor reviews and low tickets sales. The Broadway production opened at the Mark Hellinger Theatre on January 11, 1979, and moved to Broadway Theatre on March 1, 1979, where it closed after 101 performances and 38 previews. It ran for a total of 177 performances.

Reception
The production received generally mixed reviews with the Daily News calling it "polished" but "without inner energy" and The Journal News saying the "exotic" performance of actress Tovah Feldshuh kept the musical running "longer than it deserved."

Song list

Act I
"Saravá" - Vadinho, Flor and Others 
"Makulelé" - Manuel, Costas, Vadinho and Arigof 
"Vadhino Is Gone" - Flor 
"Hosanna" - Flor and Others 
"Nothing's Missing" - Teo and Flor 
"Nothing's Missing" (Reprise) - Flor 
"I'm Looking for a Man" - Dionisia and Others
"A Simple Man" - Teo 
"Viva a Vida" - All 

Act II
"Muito Bom" - Flor, Teo and Others 
"Nothing's Missing" (Reprise) - Flor and Teo 
"Play the Queen" - Flor, Vadinho, Arigof and Others 
"Which Way Do I Go?" - Flor 
"Remember" - Vadinho
"A Simple Man" (Reprise) - Teo 
"You Do" - Dionisia and Others 
"A Single Life" - Vadinho 
"Vadhino Is Gone" (Reprise) - Flor 
"Saravá" (Reprise) - Company

Cast
Tovah Feldshuh - Flor
P. J. Benjamin - Vadinho
Michael Ingram - Teo
Carol Jean Lewis - Dionisia
Roderick Spencer Sibert - Arigof
Doncharles Manning - Costas
Wilfredo Suarez - Manuel
Randy Graff - Rosalia

Awards and honors

Original Broadway production

References
 

1979 musicals
Broadway musicals
Original musicals